The Auster J/1B Aiglet is a British light civil utility aircraft developed in the 1950s.

Development

The Auster J/1 Autocrat of 1946 had achieved considerable sales success but orders died away in the late 1940s. Few sales were achieved in the important Australian market as the Autocrat's 100 h.p. engine was not powerful enough for the harsher summer conditions experienced there.

In 1950, Auster Aircraft utilised an uncompleted Autocrat airframe and wing structure and incorporated a larger fin and rudder to compensate for the installation of a 130 h.p. de Havilland Gipsy Major engine which had been modified by the fitment of double scavenge pumps to match the cooling system.

The prototype first flew in 1950 and was followed by several other conversions of Autocrat airframes, but construction soon switched to the use of new airframes. Most sales were made in Australia and New Zealand. The majority of aircraft were exported engineless to Kingsford Smith Aviation Services in Sydney where they were completed and tested before delivery.

Operational history
  
The Aiglet was particularly suited to use by agricultural spraying and dusting contractors. The spray bars were installed using supports on the Aiglet's fuselage undersurfaces and the wing struts. Most sales were to Australia and New Zealand but seven were supplied to Aerial Spraying Contractors Ltd of Boston, Lincolnshire. These were flown out to Sudan in autumn 1950 and within a month had rid  of farmland of locusts and other insect pests.

The agricultural task required operation at very low heights in conditions of extreme heat and inevitably resulted in the loss of many Aiglets in accidents. After withdrawal from crop-spraying use during the late 1950s and early 1960s, the survivors were purchased by aerial photo contractors, aero clubs and private owners. Many of these aircraft were fitted with an extra fuel tank beneath the fuselage, as shown in the adjacent photograph. 

In 2009, several Aiglets remain in airworthy condition in Australia and New Zealand and three were active in the United Kingdom.

Specifications (J/1B)

References
Notes

Bibliography

External links

Auster aircraft
1950s British agricultural aircraft
1950s British civil utility aircraft
Single-engined tractor aircraft
Aircraft first flown in 1950